2000 in professional wrestling describes the year's events in the world of professional wrestling.

List of notable promotions 
These promotions held notable shows in 2000.

Calendar of notable shows

January

February

March

April

May

June

July

August

September

October

November

December

Accomplishments and tournaments

AAA

ECW

WCW

WWF

Awards and honors

Pro Wrestling Illustrated

Wrestling Observer Newsletter

Wrestling Observer Newsletter Hall of Fame

Wrestling Observer Newsletter awards

Title changes

ECW

NJPW

WCW

WWF

Births
February 11 – Ryuki Honda
February 25 – Daniel Benoit, son of Nancy and Chris Benoit (d. 2007)
May 31 – Gable Stevenson

Debuts

Uncertain debut date
Nattie Neidhart
Tank Toland
 February – Kenny Omega
 March 19 – Trish Stratus
 April 24 – David Arquette 
 May 7 – Kevin Steen
 May 20
 Jay Briscoe
 Mark Briscoe
 July – Lance Hoyt
 August – Alberto Del Rio
 September 7 – Yoshihito Sasaki
 October 7 – The Great Khali
 October 20 – Matt Sydal
 November 11 – Austin Aries
 November 19 – Yasu Urano
 December 3 – Yuu Yamagata

Retirements

 Bret Hart (1978–2000)
 Bobby "The Brain" Heenan (1960–2000)
 Nicole Bass (1998–2000)
 Fishman (1969–2000)
 Angel of Death (1986–2000)
 Biff Wellington (1986–2000)
 Randy Savage (1973-2000) (Returned for one match in 2004) 
 Miss Elizabeth (1985–1992, 1996–2000)
 Gerald Brisco (1967-1985, 1998-June 2000) 
 Pat Patterson (1959-1985, 1998-June 2000)
 Paul Orndorff (1976-2000) (returned for a match in 2017)

Deaths 

 January 7 – Gary Albright, 36
 January 22 – Al Costello, 80
 January 24 – Bobby Duncum Jr., 34
 February 12 – Ray Hrstich, 79
 April 19 – Masakazu Fukuda, 27
 April 25 - Assassin #1, 72
 May 4 – Sugi Sito, 73
 May 13 – Jumbo Tsuruta, 49
 July 27 – Gordon Solie, 71
 July 28 – Jaime Cardriche, 32
 August 19 – Tony Parisi, 59
 August 22 – Toru Tanaka, 70
 August 25 – Chris Duffy, 35
 August 25 – Ramón Torres (wrestler), 68
 October 3 – Klondike Bill, 68 
 October 17 – Leo Nomellini, 76
 October 23 – Yokozuna, 34
 November 22:
Yoshihiro Momota, 54
Doug Hepburn, 74
 December 16 – Blue Demon, 78

See also
List of WCW pay-per-view events
List of WWF pay-per-view events
List of FMW supercards and pay-per-view events
List of ECW supercards and pay-per-view events

Notes

References

 
professional wrestling